A Pressure vessel for human occupancy is a container that is intended to be occupied by one or more persons at a pressure which differs from ambient by at least . Since 1977, the American Society of Mechanical Engineers PVHO committee has published standards governing the construction of a number of structures which are defined as Pressure Vessels for Human Occupancy. The current standard is PVHO-1-2019. Similar standards are published by a range of national and international standards organisations.

List of PVHO types
 decompression chambers
 Closed diving bells, also known as dry bells or personnel transfer capsules
 High altitude chambers
 hyperbaric chambers
 hyperbaric stretchers
 medical hyperbaric oxygenation facilities
 recompression chambers
 submarines
 Manned submersibles
 Atmospheric diving suits

Nuclear reactor containments, aerospace cabins, caissons or mild hyperbaric chambers are not considered to be PVHOs according to the standard.

References

American Society of Mechanical Engineers
Diving support equipment
Decompression equipment